The Holy Trinity Cathedral of Tbilisi ( Tbilisis cminda samebis sakatedro tadzari), commonly known as Sameba ( for Trinity), is the main cathedral of the Georgian Orthodox Church located in Tbilisi, the capital of Georgia. Constructed between 1995 and 2004, it is the third-tallest Eastern Orthodox cathedral in the world and one of the largest religious buildings in the world by total area. Sameba is a synthesis of traditional styles dominating the Georgian church architecture at various stages in history and has some Byzantine undertones.

History and construction

The idea to build a new cathedral to commemorate 1,500 years of autocephaly of the Georgian Orthodox Church and 2,000 years from the birth of Jesus emerged as early as 1989, a crucial year for the national awakening of the then-Soviet republic of Georgia. In May 1989, the Georgian Orthodox Patriarchate and the authorities of Tbilisi announced an international contest for the "Holy Trinity Cathedral" project. No winner was chosen at the first round of the contest when more than a hundred projects were submitted. Finally the design by architect Archil Mindiashvili won. The subsequent turbulent years of civil unrest in Georgia deferred this grandiose plan for six years, and it was not until 23 November 1995, that the foundation of the new cathedral was laid.

The construction of the church was proclaimed as a "symbol of the Georgian national and spiritual revival" and was sponsored mostly by anonymous donations from several businessmen and common citizens. On 23 November 2004, on St. George's Day, the cathedral was consecrated by Catholicos Patriarch of Georgia Ilia II and high-ranking representatives of fellow Orthodox Churches of the world. The ceremony was also attended by leaders of other religious and confessional communities in Georgia as well as by political leaders.

At least part of the site chosen for the new cathedral complex included land within what had once been an old Armenian cemetery called Khojavank. The cemetery once had an Armenian church destroyed during the Soviet period by the orders of Lavrenti Beria. Most of the cemetery's gravestones and monuments were also destroyed and the cemetery turned into a recreational park. However, the cemetery still contained many of its graves when construction of the Sameba Cathedral commenced. The cemetery was treated with a "scandalous lack of respect" according to one author, after bones and gravestones appeared scattered all over the construction site.

Architecture 
The Sameba Cathedral is erected on the Elia Hill, which rises above the left bank of the Kura River (Mtkvari) in the historic neighborhood of Avlabari in Old Tbilisi.

Designed in a traditional Georgian style but with a greater vertical emphasis, and "regarded as an eyesore by many people, it is equally venerated by as many others". The cathedral has a cruciform plan with a dome over a crossing resting on eight columns. At the same time, the parameters of the dome is independent from the apses, imparting a more monumental look to the dome and the church in general. The dome is surmounted by a 7.5 meter tall gilded gold cross.

The cathedral consists of nine chapels (chapels of the Archangels, John the Baptist, Saint Nino, Saint George, Saint Nicholas, the Twelve Apostles, and All Saints); five of them are situated in a large, underground compartment. The overall area of the cathedral, including its large narthex, is 3,000 square meters and the volume it occupies is 137,000 cubic meters. The interior of the church (nave) measures 56 metres by 44 metres, with an interior area of 2,380 square metres. The height of the cathedral from the ground to the top of the cross is 87.1 metres (height of stairs 1 metre). The underground chapel occupies 35,550 cubic metres and the height is 13.1 metres.

Natural materials are used for construction. The floor is made of marble tiles and the altar will also be decorated with mosaic. The painting of the murals is being executed by a group of artists guided by Amiran Goglidze.

The Sameba complex, the construction of which is already completed, consists of the main cathedral church, a free-standing bell-tower, the residence of the Patriarch, a monastery, a clerical seminary and theological academy, several workshops, places for rest, etc.

See also 
Tbilisi Sioni Cathedral
List of tallest churches
List of large Orthodox cathedrals

References

External links

Georgian Orthodox cathedrals in Georgia (country)
Georgian Orthodox churches in Tbilisi
Churches completed in 2004
2004 establishments in Georgia (country)
Tourist attractions in Tbilisi
Church buildings with domes
Byzantine Revival architecture in Georgia (country)